Craig MacLean MBE (Grantown-on-Spey, July 31, 1971) is a Scottish track cyclist who has represented Great Britain and Northern Ireland at the 2000 Summer Olympics in Sydney and the 2004 Summer Olympics in Athens, winning a silver medal in the Team Sprint at the 2000 Olympics. As a sighted guide, MacLean returned to the sport in its Paralympic form, piloting Neil Fachie to two gold medals in the 2011 UCI Para-cycling Track World Championships, and Anthony Kappes to a gold medal in the 2012 Paralympic Games. MacLean is only the second athlete, after Hungarian fencer Pál Szekeres, ever to win medals at both the Olympic and Paralympic Games.

MacLean has also won medals in five UCI Track World Championships in the team Sprint, Silver in 1999, Silver in 2000, Bronze in 2001, Gold in 2002, Bronze in 2003 and Bronze in 2004. MacLean also won a bronze medal for Scotland in the Team sprint at the 2002 Commonwealth Games, followed by a gold medal in the event at the 2006 Commonwealth Games in Australia. Having returned to the Paralympic form of the sport as a guide to Neil Fachie, he won a further two golds at the 2014 Commonwealth Games in, and for, his native Scotland; in the Commonwealth Games, certain para-cycling events are integrated as full medal events into the programme.

He was appointed Member of the Order of the British Empire (MBE) in the 2013 New Year Honours for services to cycling.

Career
Born in Grantown-on-Spey, MacLean kicked off his cycling career as second man in the Great Britain Team Sprint until switching to lead man in 2002. He broke the GB kilometre record at the Olympic Trials in 2004.

MacLean's career as a member of the British elite team came to a close in 2008. He suffered from a mystery illness ( later diagnosed as Coeliac disease) for the majority of his career so could no longer perform at the level required. This, coupled with the form of rising stars like Jason Kenny and resurgence of fellow veteran Jamie Staff, meant that he narrowly missed out on the squad for the World Championships and Olympic games.

MacLean declared that the Manchester round of the World Cup Classics in November 2008 was his last ride as a UCI accredited rider. In the World Cup round he competed in the Keirin and Sprint for the Plowman Craven Trade team. He won his Keirin heat but was relegated by the officials. In the sprint he qualified in the top 5 but lost in the first round after a controversial move by his German opponent.

He sat out international competition for two years from 2008 to 2010, the mandatory requirement to become a pilot for para-cycling tandem racing. At the 2011 UCI Para-cycling Track World Championships, MacLean piloted Neil Fachie to golds in the Tandem B Sprint and Tandem B 1000m Time Trial.

In 2012, he switched to piloting Anthony Kappes, with Barney Storey piloting Fachie; the move was a success for both tandems, as each tandem team won a gold medal at the 2012 Paralympic Games. In doing so, MacLean became only the second athlete to win medals at both Olympic and Paralympic Games.

While sitting out international competition, he continued to make some racing appearances at the Revolution events in Manchester. He appeared at Revolution 22 in December 2008, competing in the Sprint and Keirin events.

MacLean reunited with Neil Fachie for the 2014 Commonwealth Games in Glasgow, where the pairing won gold in the kilo time trial. They followed this up with another gold in the sprint where they came back from losing their first ride in the final to beat the Australian duo of Kieran Modra and Jason Niblett 2–1.

Television and Media

In 2007 MacLean had an experimental documentary made about him called Standing Start made by BAFTA winner Adrian McDowall and Finlay Pretsell. The film documents MacLean in his build up to the World Cup team sprint win in 2007. The film has screened worldwide and premiered at the Edinburgh International Film Festival.

In November 2008 Craig took up the challenge of becoming a Bobsleigh competitor for the BBC programme 'Bobsleigh Challenge', which was broadcast in February 2009. This programme challenged Craig and fellow British sportsmen Jason Gardener, Dean Macey and Dan Luger to qualify for the British Championships in Italy, with only 10 days training. Craig teamed up with Luger as one team, while Macey and Gardener made up the other team. After training the teams had to complete two runs down the course without crashing to qualify. After a number of crashes, when both Craig and Dan were driving, both did qualify. However a number further crashes and injuries sustained by Craig meant that they did not complete two runs in the actual competition and were not classified. Just qualifying for the event with only 10 days training was still a remarkable achievement. The other team of Macey and Gardener went one better and finished 6th overall in the competition, ahead of one of the Great Britain Olympic Development teams.

Craig is featured alongside Chris Hoy in a book by Richard Moore, Heroes, Villains and Velodromes: Chris Hoy and Britain's Track Cycling Revolution. This describes how Maclean and Hoy were key figures in the rise of British Track Cycling. The book was published in June 2008 by HarperCollins.

In 2009, he was inducted into the British Cycling Hall of Fame.

Major results

1999
2nd Team sprint, Track World Championships
2000
2nd Team Sprint, 2000 Summer Olympics
2nd Team sprint, Track World Championships
2001
3rd Team sprint, Track World Championships
2002
1st Team sprint, Track World Championships
3rd Team sprint, Commonwealth Games
2003
3rd Team sprint, Track World Championships
1st Kilo, British National Track Championships
1st Team sprint, British National Track Championships
2004
3rd Team sprint, Track World Championships
2nd Team sprint, Round 1, Moscow, 2004 Track World Cup
1st Kilo, Round 3, Manchester, 2004 Track World Cup
1st Team sprint, Round 3, Manchester, 2004 Track World Cup
1st Sprint, Round 4, Sydney, 2004 Track World Cup
1st Team sprint, Round 4, Sydney, 2004 Track World Cup
2005
1st Team sprint, Round 3, Manchester, 2004–2005 Track World Cup
2nd Sprint, Round 1, Moscow, 2006–2007 Track World Cup
2nd Team sprint, Round 1, Moscow, 2006–2007 Track World Cup
1st Team sprint, Round 2, Manchester, 2006–2007 Track World Cup
1st Sprint, British National Track Championships
2006
1st Team sprint, Commonwealth Games
2nd Sprint, Track World Championships
2nd Team sprint, Track World Championships
1st Sprint, Round 1, Sydney, 2006–2007 Track World Cup
1st Team sprint, Round 1, Sydney, 2006–2007 Track World Cup
3rd Sprint, Round 2, Moscow, 2006–2007 Track World Cup
1st Team sprint, Round 2, Moscow, 2006–2007 Track World Cup
1st Sprint, British National Track Championships
1st Team sprint, British National Track Championships
2007
2nd Masters of Sprint
1st Team sprint, Round 4, Manchester, 2006–2007 Track World Cup

See also
 2012 Summer Olympics and Paralympics gold post boxes
City of Edinburgh Racing Club
Achievements of members of City of Edinburgh Racing Club

References

External links

Commonwealth Games bronze medallists for Scotland
Commonwealth Games gold medallists for Scotland
Cyclists at the 2000 Summer Olympics
Cyclists at the 2002 Commonwealth Games
Cyclists at the 2004 Summer Olympics
Cyclists at the 2006 Commonwealth Games
Members of the Order of the British Empire
Olympic cyclists of Great Britain
Olympic silver medallists for Great Britain
People from Badenoch and Strathspey
Scottish male cyclists
1971 births
Living people
Olympic medalists in cycling
Cyclists at the 2012 Summer Paralympics
Paralympic sighted guides
Sportspeople from Highland (council area)
Cyclists at the 2014 Commonwealth Games
UCI Track Cycling World Champions (men)
Medalists at the 2000 Summer Olympics
Paralympic gold medalists for Great Britain
Commonwealth Games medallists in cycling
Scottish track cyclists
Paralympic medalists in cycling
Medalists at the 2012 Summer Paralympics
Paralympic cyclists of Great Britain
Scottish Olympic medallists
Medallists at the 2002 Commonwealth Games
Medallists at the 2006 Commonwealth Games
Medallists at the 2014 Commonwealth Games